Zheng Lihui (born 1980 in Xiantao, Hubei) is a male Chinese gymnast. Xiao was part of the Chinese team that won the gold medal in the team event at the 2000 Summer Olympics in Sydney.

Major performances
1996 National Championships - 1st team
1997 Catania World University Games - 1st individual all-around & team
1998 National Championships - 1st team (226.925pts)
1999 National Championships - 2nd team
1999 National Champions Tournament - 2nd individual all-around
2000 National Championships & Olympic Selective Trials - 4th individual all-around 2000 Sydney Olympic Games - 1st team

References

 - China Daily

1980 births
Living people
Gymnasts at the 2000 Summer Olympics
Chinese male artistic gymnasts
Olympic gymnasts of China
Olympic gold medalists for China
Olympic medalists in gymnastics
Gymnasts from Hubei
People from Xiantao
Medalists at the 2000 Summer Olympics
Universiade medalists in gymnastics
Universiade gold medalists for China
Universiade silver medalists for China
Medalists at the 1997 Summer Universiade
21st-century Chinese people